Whitford is a rural town, to the south-east of Auckland, New Zealand. There are multiple versions of how the town was named.  It may be named after Richard Whitford, a man who operated a flax mill on the  Waikopua near Housons Creek and was the postman. Others think Whitford referred to the White-ford over the Turanga Creek at the end of Sandstone Road, where the salt dries when the tide is out.  Another possibility is that it is named after Whitefoord Park part of a  vast property belonging to L.D. Nathan was initially listed as ‘Whitefoord Park’ in Wises Post Office Directory for 1875–1876, but by the time it went on sale for subdivision in 1903 it was known as Whitford Park.

Historical facts
 Whitford is traditionally home to the Māori of Ngāi Tai descendants of the Tainui waka which moored at the Turanga river. Ngāi Tai also had the Pā sites Mangemangeroa, Moananui and Awakarihi (above Whitford quarry).
 Whitford's first European settlers, George and William Trice, started a popular and productive farm on Clifton Road near the village settlement in 1843. Most of the following settlers arrived in the mid-1850s.
 The Nathans' “Whitford Park” estate provided feathers from its ostriches for use in the fashion trade from 1869 until the 1920s. Racehorses were also trained there; this practice still occurs today.
 The town's Granger's brickworks operated from the 1878 until 1920. The Trices goldmine was converted to a landfill. Today, metal is quarried from there.
 Transport usually occurred via water until the 1920s, when roads and motor transport were improved.
 Today, Whitford has a real estate agent, accountant, dentist, service station, restaurant, gift shop, a hair salon and a furniture restoration establishment. Lifestyle blocks for city workers now occupy some farms. Beef, sheep, dairy, and timber are the chief economic activities.
 Ayrlies Garden, one of New Zealand's best-known gardens, is located in Whitford. In the areas surrounding the gardens is a lifestyle estate subdivision expected to be completed in the year 2022. 
 Due to modern advancements in infrastructure in the surrounding areas such as Beachlands and Ormiston, the Whitford village area has seen a substantial increase in traffic flow. This is expected to further increase in the future.

Demographics
The SA1 area is part of the larger Turanga statistical area.

The SA1 statistical area had a population of 147 at the 2018 New Zealand census, a decrease of 18 people (−10.9%) since the 2013 census, and an increase of 15 people (11.4%) since the 2006 census. There were 45 households, comprising 78 males and 69 females, giving a sex ratio of 1.13 males per female. The median age was 46.7 years (compared with 37.4 years nationally), with 27 people (18.4%) aged under 15 years, 27 (18.4%) aged 15 to 29, 75 (51.0%) aged 30 to 64, and 18 (12.2%) aged 65 or older.

Ethnicities were 87.8% European/Pākehā, 12.2% Māori, and 6.1% Asian. People may identify with more than one ethnicity.

Although some people chose not to answer the census's question about religious affiliation, 44.9% had no religion, 40.8% were Christian and 2.0% were Buddhist.

Of those at least 15 years old, 30 (25.0%) people had a bachelor's or higher degree, and 15 (12.5%) people had no formal qualifications. The median income was $45,400, compared with $31,800 nationally. 36 people (30.0%) earned over $70,000 compared to 17.2% nationally. The employment status of those at least 15 was that 66 (55.0%) people were employed full-time, 21 (17.5%) were part-time, and 3 (2.5%) were unemployed.

Turanga statistical area

Turanga had a population of 3,015 at the 2018 New Zealand census, an increase of 213 people (7.6%) since the 2013 census, and an increase of 504 people (20.1%) since the 2006 census. There were 972 households, comprising 1,506 males and 1,509 females, giving a sex ratio of 1.0 males per female. The median age was 44.0 years (compared with 37.4 years nationally), with 552 people (18.3%) aged under 15 years, 582 (19.3%) aged 15 to 29, 1,449 (48.1%) aged 30 to 64, and 429 (14.2%) aged 65 or older.

Ethnicities were 83.5% European/Pākehā, 7.5% Māori, 2.0% Pacific peoples, 13.4% Asian, and 2.3% other ethnicities. People may identify with more than one ethnicity.

The percentage of people born overseas was 28.2, compared with 27.1% nationally.

Although some people chose not to answer the census's question about religious affiliation, 51.6% had no religion, 37.7% were Christian, 0.1% had Māori religious beliefs, 0.3% were Hindu, 0.8% were Muslim, 1.3% were Buddhist and 1.8% had other religions.

Of those at least 15 years old, 663 (26.9%) people had a bachelor's or higher degree, and 273 (11.1%) people had no formal qualifications. The median income was $45,500, compared with $31,800 nationally. 744 people (30.2%) earned over $70,000 compared to 17.2% nationally. The employment status of those at least 15 was that 1,272 (51.6%) people were employed full-time, 468 (19.0%) were part-time, and 66 (2.7%) were unemployed.

References

Populated places in the Auckland Region
Populated places around the Hauraki Gulf / Tīkapa Moana